Helsinki Shipyard Oy is a Finnish shipbuilding company based at Hietalahti shipyard in Helsinki, Finland. The company was established in 2019 to continue the shipbuilding activities of Arctech Helsinki Shipyard in Finland.

History 

Helsinki Shipyard was established in May 2019 to take over the shipbuilding activities of Arctech Helsinki Shipyard at Hietalahti shipyard in downtown Helsinki. The company had become an economic burden for its Russian owners after the European Union and the United States imposed economic sanctions on the shipyard's Russian state-owned parent company, United Shipbuilding Corporation (USC), as a response to the Russian involvement in the unrest in Ukraine. In early 2018, it was reported that USC was looking for a new majority owner for Arctech Helsinki Shipyard which was making heavy cumulative losses and had been unable to attract new orders since 2016. In April 2019, the Russian government finally authorized the sale of the shipyard.

The sale of the shipbuilding operations in Finland was announced on 15 May 2019. In preparation of the transaction, a new shipbuilding company Helsinki Shipyard would be established to take over the assets and operations of Arctech Helsinki Shipyard at Hietalahti Shipyard. It would then be sold to Algador Holdings, a private Russian company owned by Rishat Bagautdinov ja Vladimir Kasyanenko while Arctech would remain as a subsidiary of the United Shipbuilding Corporation and continue shipbuilding operations in Russia as a shareholder of the Saint Petersburg-based Nevsky Shipyard. Victor Olerskiy, the former deputy Russian transport minister and the former head of Federal Agency of Maritime and River Transportation, was appointed as the chairman of the board of the new company.

Orders 

Shortly after the change of ownership, the new owners hinted that the first shipbuilding order for the new company would be announced within a month from its founding. In late May 2019, Hufvudstadsbladet reported that the shipyard had signed a letter of intent for the construction of two 150-to-160-passenger expedition cruise ships to an undisclosed buyer. On 27 June, the shipyard confirmed an order for two  expedition cruise ships with capacity of 157 passengers under the name "Project Vega". While Kommersant initially reported that the ships would be built for Vodohod, a Russian shipping company owned by the same people who acquired the Helsinki shipyard, in 2020 it was revealed that the vessels would be operated by the revived British cruise line Swan Hellenic. Steel block production began at Western Baltija Shipbuilding in Klaipėda, Lithuania, on 27 April 2020 and hull assembly of the first vessel, SH Minerva, began with keel laying in Helsinki on 24 September 2020, followed by launching on 23 June 2021 and delivery in late November. The keel of the second vessel, SH Vega, was laid on 4 February 2021 The Polar Class 5 vessels were delivered in 2021 and 2022, respectively.

On 20 October 2020, Finnish media reported that Helsinki Shipyard was about to sign a shipbuilding contract for a third expedition cruise ship for Swan Hellenic. On the following day, the shipyard confirmed a 150 million euro order for a Polar Class 6 luxury cruise ship with a capacity of 196 passengers in 96 cabins. The construction of the ship began on 10 June 2021 with steel cutting at CRIST in Poland and the keel will be laid in Helsinki in late 2021. The  SH Diana, slightly larger than its two predecessors, is scheduled to enter service in early 2023.

On 18 January 2022, Helsinki Shipyard announced that it had received an order for a large LNG-powered icebreaker from Norilsk Nickel in late 2021. The construction of the largest and most powerful diesel-electric icebreaker ever built in Finland was planned to begin in 2022 with delivery slated for late 2024. In February 2022, the project was put on hold due to international sanctions following Russia's invasion to Ukraine. On 30 September 2022, the Ministry for Foreign Affairs refused to grant an export license for the vessel.

List of ships built or on order

References

Manufacturing companies based in Helsinki
Shipbuilding companies of Finland